The AFC fourth round of 2010 FIFA World Cup qualification was decided by a random draw conducted in Kuala Lumpur, Malaysia on 27 June 2008. The round commenced on 6 September 2008, and finished on 17 June 2009.

The top two countries in each group at the end of the stage qualified directly to the World Cup Finals in South Africa, with the two third-placed countries advancing to the AFC play-off.

Format
The 10 teams (2 teams from each group in the third round) were divided into four pots for the draw, three containing two teams and one containing four. The seeding for the fourth round was based on that used in the third round draw, but Saudi Arabia and Japan (seeded equal 4th in that draw) were separated by a random selection held at the start of the fourth round draw. The pots were as follows:

The 10 teams were split into two groups of five teams each – each containing one team from each of Pots 1, 2 and 3, as well as 2 teams from Pot 4.

The top two teams in each group qualified for the World Cup Finals, with the two third-placed sides advancing to a playoff. All teams played home and away against each of the other four teams in the group.

Group A

Group B

Goalscorers
As of 17 June, there have been 80 goals scored in 40 games, for an average of 2 goals per game.
3 goals

  Tim Cahill
  Javad Nekounam
  Lee Keun-Ho
  Park Ji-sung
  Farhod Tadjiyev

2 goals

  Brett Emerton
  Joshua Kennedy
  Shunsuke Nakamura
  Keiji Tamada
  Marcus Tulio Tanaka
  Mun In-Guk
  Ki Sung-Yueng
  Park Chu-Young
  Naif Hazazi
  Abdoh Otaif
  Masoud Shojaei
  Mahmood Abdulrahman

1 goal

  Mark Bresciano
  David Carney
  Scott Chipperfield
  Harry Kewell
  Mile Sterjovski
  Faouzi Mubarak Aaish
  Abdulla Baba Fatadi
  Salman Isa
  Karim Bagheri
  Ali Karimi
  Mehdi Mahdavikia
  Yasuhito Endō
  Kengo Nakamura
  Shinji Okazaki
  Tatsuya Tanaka
  An Chol-Hyok
  Choe Kum-Chol
  Hong Yong-Jo
  Jong Tae-Se
  Pak Nam-Chol
  Kim Chi-Woo
  Kwak Tae-Hwi
  Ali Afif
  Talal Al-Bloushi
  Magid Mohamed
  Majdi Siddiq
  Sebastián Soria
  Ahmed Al-Fraidi
  Saad Al-Harthi
  Osama Al-Muwallad
  Ismail Al Hammadi
  Mohammed Al Shehhi
  Abdulrahim Jumaa
  Subait Khater
  Ismail Matar
  Bashir Saeed
  Maksim Shatskikh
  Anvarjon Soliev

1 own goal

  Marcus Tulio Tanaka (for Bahrain)
  Fares Juma (for Saudi Arabia)
  Ahmed Faris Al-Binali (for Japan)

Notes

Several Iranian players started their away match against South Korea wearing green armbands or wristbands, a symbol of protest at the outcome of the Iranian presidential election. Most removed them at half-time. The newspaper Iran reported that Ali Karimi, Mehdi Mahdavikia, Hosein Kaebi, and Vahid Hashemian had received life bans from the Iranian FA for the gesture. However, the Iranian FA denied this claim in a response to FIFA's inquiry saying that "the comments in foreign media are nothing but lies and a mischievous act." The Iran national team head coach Afshin Ghotbi also confirmed that it was a rumour and Iranian FA "has not taken any official stand on this issue."

References

4
2008 in Asian football
2009 in Asian football
2008 in Australian soccer
2009 in Australian soccer
2008 in Japanese football
2009 in Japanese football
2008 in Uzbekistani football
2009 in Uzbekistani football
2008 in South Korean football
2009 in South Korean football
2008 in North Korean football
2009 in North Korean football
2008–09 in Qatari football
2008–09 in Bahraini football
2008–09 in Saudi Arabian football
2008–09 in Iranian football
2008–09 in Emirati football